The Michael the Brave 30th Guards Brigade is a primarily ceremonial, as well as combat unit of the Romanian Land Forces established 1860.

History 
The unit was established on 1 July 1860 through a decree issued by Prince Alexandru Ioan Cuza as Batalionul 1 Tiraliori (1st Tirailleur Battalion), which ensured the security of Royal palaces. Soon after, it was renamed to Batalionul 1 de Vânători (1st Vânători Battalion) and was reassigned to the Ministry of War. It was abolished by the communist government in 1948. Until 1990, ceremonial duties were served by the Honor Guard Unit of the Romanian People's Army (Garda de Onoare a Armatei Populare Române). The general staff of the armed forces revived the unit as a battalion on 23 February 1990 following the Romanian Revolution. On 25 July 2001 the battalion was upgraded to the level of a brigade, and has been named after Mihai Viteazul (Michael the Brave) since 2006. The unit was awarded with the National Order of Faithful Service in 2015 on the occasion of the brigade's 155th anniversary.

Mission

Honor Guard Company

The primary mission of the brigade is to perform the required military honours for the President of Romania, Minister of Defence and foreign leaders. It also takes part in events such as the inauguration of a president, military parades, state funerals and military tattoos, as well as the Guard Mounting ceremony at the Mormântul Soldatului Necunoscut in Bucharest. Ceremonies for state visits usually involve more than 100 soldiers of the brigade and the regimental band.

The company has taken part in ceremonies in Romania, and has represented the country in the 2007 Bastille Day military parade in France, and the 2016 Chișinău Independence Day Parade in Moldova.

It has two different tunics.

Regimental Band

The regimental band (Muzica Regimentului) provides musical support to the ceremonial activities of the honor guard. The band, which is currently made up of 60 musicians, is led by Lieutenant Colonel Marian Constantin.

Special Purpose Unit
The brigade maintains a special purpose unit that engages targeting threats to the Bucharest Garrison as well as acts as security and military police in the city. During the Romanian Revolution in December 1989, 15 soldiers from the brigade's special purpose unit were killed while in duty.

Church
The Military Church "Saint Great Martyr Mina" in Bucharest is a place of worship that belongs to the regiment.

Gallery

See also 
 Romanian Armed Forces
 Romanian Land Forces
 Guard of honour
 Honor Guard Company (Moldova)
 Great Union Day
 Structure of the Romanian Land Forces
 6th Special Operations Brigade "Mihai Viteazul" (Romania)

References

External links 
 ROMANII AU TALENT 2018 - BRIGADA 30 GARDA MIHAI VITEAZUL
 Drill team Brigada 30 Garda "Mihai Viteazul" 1 Dec 2010
 Ziua Porţilor Deschise la Brigada 30 Gardă "Mihai Viteazul"
 Regimentul 30 garda Mihai Viteazu
 Regimental Documentary (2003)

1860 establishments in Romania
Regiments of Romania
Guards of honour